The 1898 North Dakota gubernatorial election was held on November 8, 1898. Republican nominee Frederick B. Fancher defeated Democratic nominee David M. Holmes with 59.22% of the vote.

General election

Candidates
Frederick B. Fancher, Republican
David M. Holmes, Democratic

Results

References

1898
North Dakota
Gubernatorial